Maxim Aleksandrovich Chuzhkov (born 11 April 1987) is a Russian beach soccer player serving as goalkeeper. He is a five-time national champion for Rotor Volgograd (1), Lokomotiv Moscow(1) and Kristall.(3)

Career
Maxim Chuzhkov was born in Samara. He was a gymnast for six years before switching to football. Chuzhkov discovered beach soccer in 2010, and one year later he joined Krylya Sovetov from Samara. From 2012 to 2014 he played for Rotor Volgograd, winning with them the club's first and only Russian Beach Soccer Championships trophy in 2014. In the final he shot one goal and after the match he was named best goalkeeper of the championships. 

He then switched to Lokomotiv Moscow in 2015. Two years later Lokomotiv became champions, defeating Kristall in the final. Chuzhkov was named best goalkeeper of the tournament. Since 2018, Chuzhkov plays for Kristall, with which he became threefold national champion, when Kristall defeated Delta Saratov in 2018.

In 2019, Maxim Chuzhkov, Artur Paporotnyi, Anton Shkarin and Yuri Krashennikov each scored a goal at the 2019 FIFA Beach Soccer World Cup, resulting to a 7–1 after the whistle.

Achievements

National team
FIFA Beach Soccer World Cup champion: 2021
Euro Beach Soccer League champion: 2014, 2017

Clubs
Euro Winners Cup: 2021, 2019.
Mundialito de Clubes: 2017
Russian National champion: 2014, 2017, 2018, 2019, 2021
Russian Cup champion: 2014, 2016, 2018, 2019, 2020, 2021.
Russian Super Cup: 2018

Individually
2014 Russian National Championships – Best Goalkeeper
2015 Russian National Championships – Best Goalkeeper
2015 Russian National Championships – Best Goalkeeper
2017 Euro Beach Soccer League – Best Goalkeeper
2018 Euro Beach Soccer League, Stage 3 – Best Goalkeeper
2019 World Beach Games – Europe Qualifier – Best Goalkeeper, Best Assistant
2019 FIFA Beach Soccer World Cup qualification – Best Goalkeeper
2019 Beach Soccer Stars – Best Goalkeeper
2019 Beach Soccer Stars – Best Five
2021 Euro Winners Cup – Best Goalkeeper

References

External links
Profile on Beach Soccer Russia
Profile on BSC Kristall 

1987 births
Living people
Russian beach soccer players
Beach soccer goalkeepers
Sportspeople from Samara, Russia
European Games competitors for Russia
Beach soccer players at the 2019 European Games